The Statue of James Douglas is an statue, installed outside the Fort Langley National Historic Site in Fort Langley, British Columbia, Canada.

References

Monuments and memorials in British Columbia
Statues in Canada
Sculptures of men in Canada